Robert Janssens (born 1939) is a Belgian composer and conductor. He is a French-speaking member of the Union of Belgian Composers, one of whose essential missions is "to disseminate the orchestral production of our compositions".

Janssens studied at the Royal Conservatory of Liège and Brussels. He initially taught at the École Normale in Brussels.

Among his religious works, the Mass of the artistes is particularly noteworthy, as is the Requiem, which was celebrated with standing ovations at its premiere in Brussels in 2004.

He is the permanent conductor of the Ensemble symphonique de Bruxelles.

Works 
Quatre impromptus for piano, 1977
Les marionnettes de Toone for orchestra, 1978
Conversations for flute, clarinet, oboe and bassoon, 1981
Narcisse to a text by Frederika Blanka for voice and orchestra without piano, 1981
Le chant du pou for flute, 1982
Le Messe des artistes, dite de St François for soprano, women choir and orchestra, 1982
Prélude et fugues for organ, 1983
Concertino for clarinet and piano or strings, 1984
Concertino per fagotto for bassoon and orchestra or piano, 1987
Hommage à Ravel for piano, 1987
Silver Trio for flute, violin and cello, 1987
Les chemins de la liberté for two pianos, 1988
Les sonates de l'Abbaye for chamber orchestra, 1988
Trio for flute, violin and viola, 1988
Toy toy for piano, 1990
Mutatis mutandis for cello, double bass or viola and piano, 1991
Utinam for piano, 1991
Concerto n°2 for piano or violin and orchestra or violin and piano, 1992
Zodia, 1992
Disneyland for clarinet and piano, 1992
Sonate "facile" for clarinet and piano, 1992
Yerma, ballet, 1992, 1996
Voyage au pays sonore... for alto saxophone, percussion, accordion, piano and synthesizer, 1993
Sonatine for recorder and harpsichord, 1994
Thème et variations for flute and guitar, 1994
String quartet n°1, 1999
Concerto for cello and orchestra, 2001
String quartet n°2, 2004
Requiem for mixed choir and orchestra, 2004
String quartet n°3, 2005
Kid Soon for soprano, choir and orchestra, 2005
Trio à clavier, 2005
Trio for violin, viola and cello, 2005
Kyrie? Allo? for soprano, baritone, women's and children's choir and orchestra, 2006
Vidimus Stellam for mixed choir, organ and orchestra, 2007

References

External links 
 
 

1939 births
Living people
Musicians from Brussels
Belgian conductors (music)
Belgian composers
Male composers
Academic staff of the Royal Conservatory of Brussels
20th-century classical composers
21st-century classical composers
Male conductors (music)
20th-century Belgian male musicians
21st-century male musicians